Vishnu Vaman Bapat (1871–??) was an Indian philosopher, famous for his commentary in Marathi on ancient Sanskrit texts.

His works include
 Commentary on Adi Shankara's Brahmasutra
 Bauddhadharanisar
 Sankhayttwakoomudisar

References

External links
 
 Sankhayttwakoomudisar (1909), Online text at archive.org

1871 births
Marathi-language writers
Year of death unknown
19th-century Indian philosophers